Poa morrisii, commonly known as soft tussock-grass is a species of tussock grass that is endemic to Australia.

The species was formally described in 1970 by Australian botanist  Joyce Winifred Vickery based on plant material collected in Sandringham, Victoria by P. Morris in 1939.

References

morrisii
Poales of Australia
Flora of South Australia
Flora of Victoria (Australia)